Jonathan Morgan Heit (born July 16, 2000) is an American former teen actor and currently a gallerist. He is known for his role in the Adam Sandler film, Bedtime Stories, where he played Patrick. He also directed and wrote a short film entitled It Happens, about a man who has a terrible day.

Heit is the son of Melissa Segal and Jay Heit. His professional acting debut was in 2006, when he appeared in the television series Close to Home and General Hospital. In 2007, he appeared in 2 more television shows, ER and the talk show The Showbiz Show with David Spade. Heit was one of the 2 child leads in the 2008 film Bedtime Stories. He also did voice over for Holly and Hal Moose: Our Uplifting Christmas Adventure and Santa Buddies. Recently, Heit has appeared in Valentine's Day and Date Night. He also had a leading role in the TV series, Granite Flats.  Heit was the voice of Cubby in the Disney Junior series Jake and the Never Land Pirates for season 1-early season 3 before he was replaced by Jadon Sand. He quit acting in 2016 to work as a gallerist for his Heit Gallery.

Filmography

References

External links 

2000 births
American male child actors
American male film actors
American male television actors
Living people
Place of birth missing (living people)
21st-century American male actors